Pernell Elven Roberts Jr. (May 18, 1928 – January 24, 2010) was an American stage, film, and television actor, activist, and singer. In addition to guest-starring in over 60 television series, he was best known for his roles as Ben Cartwright's eldest son Adam Cartwright on the Western television series Bonanza (1959–1965), and as chief surgeon Dr. John McIntyre, the title character on Trapper John, M.D. (1979–1986).

Roberts was also known for his lifelong activism, which included participation in the Selma to Montgomery marches in 1965 and pressuring NBC to refrain from hiring White people to portray minority characters.

Early life
Roberts was born in 1928 in Waycross, Georgia, the only child of Pernell Elven Roberts Sr., a Dr Pepper salesman, and Minnie (Betty) Myrtle Morgan Roberts. During his high-school years, Pernell played the horn, acted in school and church plays, and sang in local USO shows. He attended, but did not graduate from, Georgia Tech. Enlisting in 1946, he served for two years in the United States Marine Corps. He played the tuba and horn in the Marine Corps Band, and he was also skilled at playing the sousaphone and percussion. He later attended, also without graduating, the University of Maryland, where he had his first exposure to acting in classical theatre. He appeared in four productions while a student, including Othello and Antigone, but left school to act in summer stock.

In 1949, he made his professional stage debut with Moss Hart and Kitty Carlisle in The Man Who Came to Dinner at the Olney Theatre in Olney, Maryland. Later, he spent eight weeks at the Bryn Mawr College Theatre in Philadelphia, portraying Dan in Emlyn Williams' Night Must Fall and Alfred Doolittle in Bernard Shaw's Pygmalion.

In 1952, Roberts moved to New York City, where he appeared first off-Broadway in one-act operas and ballets with the North American Lyric Theatre, with the Shakespearewrights, at the Equity Library Theatre, and later on Broadway with performances in Tonight in Samarkand (also in Washington, DC), The Lovers opposite Joanne Woodward, and A Clearing in the Woods with Robert Culp and Kim Stanley. He won a Drama Desk Award in 1955 for his performance in an off-Broadway rendition of Macbeth, which was followed by the role of Mercutio in Romeo and Juliet. He performed in Twelfth Night, The Merchant of Venice, Dr. Faustus, and The Taming of the Shrew at the American Shakespeare Festival, and later on Broadway. He performed in St. Joan (1954, Cleveland), Down in the Valley (at the Provincetown Playhouse), The Duchess of Malfi, Measure for Measure, and King John.

In 1956, Roberts returned to the Olney Theatre, starring opposite Jan Farrand in Much Ado About Nothing with the Players, Inc. group. The same year, Roberts made his television debut in the "Shadow of Suspicion" episode of Kraft Television Theater, followed by guest-starring roles in Whirlybirds, Gunsmoke, Cimarron City, Buckskin, Sugarfoot, and Cheyenne.

Roberts signed a contract with Columbia Pictures in 1957, and made his film debut a year later as one of Burl Ives' contentious sons in Desire Under the Elms (1958). The film was nominated for a Best Cinematography Academy Award. He also landed a character role in The Sheepman (1958), opposite Glenn Ford and Shirley MacLaine, and continued to guest-star on television shows such as episodes of Shirley Temple Storybook Theater ("The Emperor's New Clothes", "Rumplestiltskin", "The Sleeping Beauty", and "Hiawatha"),  the live-broadcast Matinee Theater, where he starred again in Shakespeare's Much Ado About Nothing, and in The Heart's Desire. This was followed by appearances in Trackdown, Buckskin, and episodes of Zane Grey Theater. Roberts guest-starred as Captain Jacques Chavez on the NBC adventure series Northwest Passage  (1958). He appeared with fellow guest star Fay Spain in the 1958 episode "Pick Up the Gun" of Tombstone Territory and played the lead villain in the 31st episode ("Hey Boy's Revenge") of Have Gun – Will Travel, portraying a killer boss exploiter of Chinese coolie laborers.

In 1959, Roberts guest-starred in episodes of General Electric Theater, Cimarron City, Sugarfoot, Lawman, One Step Beyond, Bronco, 77 Sunset Strip, The Detectives, and House Call. Also in 1959, he co-starred in the film Ride Lonesome. "If Roberts felt typecast by Westerns, they also provided his finest role in this film, arguably the greatest of the B-movies starring Randolph Scott and directed by Budd Boetticher. Roberts recognized the film's classic structure; his engaging outlaw, Sam Boone, counterpoints Scott's granite-faced Ben Brigade, maintaining the tension of whether they will work together or clash. He similarly played off James Coburn, who was making his film debut as Boone's quiet sidekick, Whit." The same year, he was cast in Bonanza.

Bonanza

Roberts played Ben Cartwright's urbane eldest son Adam, in the Western television series Bonanza. Unlike his brothers, Adam was a university-educated architectural engineer.

Roberts, having largely been "a stage actor, accustomed as he was to a rigorous diet of the classics" and to freely move about from part to part, found the "transition to a television series", playing the same character, "without costume changes", a difficult one. "It was perhaps not surprising that, despite enormous success, he left Bonanza after the 1964–65 season, criticizing the show's simple-minded content and lack of minority actors...".  It particularly distressed him that his character, a man in his 30s, had to defer continually to the wishes of his widowed father, and he reportedly disliked the series itself, calling it "junk" television and accusing NBC of "perpetuating banality and contributing to the dehumanization of the industry." The equally self-critical Roberts ("I guess I'll never be satisfied with my own work"), "had long disdained the medium's commercialization of his craft and its mass-production, assembly-line mindset." Frustrated with Bonanza and angry, he told a reporter in 1965, "I feel I'm an aristocrat in my field of endeavor. My being part of Bonanza was like Isaac Stern sitting in with Lawrence Welk".

In much later interviews, Roberts denied statements about Bonanza attributed to him. "I did not enjoy Bonanza anymore...but I never said those things people said I said." He was, however, "too wise not to recognize its weaknesses." In a 1963 interview, he asked a reporter, "Isn't it a bit silly for three adult males to have to ask father's permission for everything they do?" "They told me the four characters (Lorne Greene, patriarch Ben, Dan Blocker and Michael Landon as his brothers) would be carefully defined and the scripts carefully prepared; none of it ever happened," he complained to the Associated Press in 1964. He objected to how Bonanza portrayed the relationship between the "father" and adult "sons", describing it as "adolescent".

Roberts acknowledged reasons for Bonanzas appeal, but pointed to his personal need for story lines with greater social relevance, adult themes, and dialogue. He wanted Bonanza to be "a little more grown up" (Mike Douglas Show, 1966).  He also noted that he was not suited to the "procedural" and "confining aspect" of series television, another reason for his dissatisfaction, while on the show.(Mike Douglas Show, 1966)

Roberts had high hopes for what he could contribute to Bonanza and was disappointed with the direction of the show, and the limitations imposed on his Bonanza character and on his acting range. In a newspaper interview, he said, "I haven't grown at all since the series began...I have an impotent role. Wherever I turn there's the father image."

Finally, after disagreements with writers and producers over the quality of the scripts, characterization, and Bonanza'''s refusal to allow him to perform elsewhere while on contract, Roberts "turned his back on Hollywood wisdom and well-meant advice," and left, largely to return to legitimate theater.Henry Darrow archival interview; USA Today, January 25, 2010)

Roberts fulfilled, but did not extend his six-year contract for Bonanza, and when he left the series, his character was eliminated with the explanation that Adam had "moved away." Later episodes suggested variously that Adam was "at sea", had moved to Europe, or was on the East Coast, running that end of the family business. The last episode Pernell Roberts worked on was "Dead and Gone", air date April 4, 1965. He appeared in the next two that aired, which were filmed prior to "Dead and Gone" — "A Good Night's Rest", air date April 11, 1965, and "To Own The World", air date April 18, 1965. Adam Cartwright was mentioned on occasion in the series (including a 1967 episode that did not air until April 4, 1971 ("Kingdom of Fear").  In television interviews, Roberts said that he would have stayed with Bonanza, had he been allowed to do so on a part-time basis to enable him to return to theater. Bonanza producer David Dortort described Roberts as "rebellious, outspoken... and aloof," but as one who "could make any scene he was in better...". In a later archive interview, he regretted not having insisted on a "marriage for Adam" and having Roberts continue on the show as a semiregular. He added, "I must confess..I was too hard on him. I did not appreciate him. I knew he was good, but I didn't realize he was that good...none better." In the last two Bonanza movies that aired on NBC in the early 1990s, the story line stated that Adam, now in Australia, had equaled his father's success, dominating the engineering/construction business.

Roberts was the only accomplished singer of the original cast, though David Canary, who joined Bonanza in 1967, had a background in voice and performed on Broadway. During Roberts' Bonanza years, he recorded Come All Ye Fair and Tender Ladies, a folk music album, which AllMusic calls "...the softer, lyrical side of folk music — pleasant and not challenging, but quite rewarding in its unassuming way." The album, released by RCA Victor and arranged by Dick Rosmini, is available on compact disc only as part of the fourth disc of the Bonanza 4-CD boxed set on Bear Family Records.

On the Bonanza box-set albums, Roberts also sings "Early One Morning", "In the Pines", "The New Born King", "The Bold Soldier", "Mary Ann", "They Call the Wind Maria", "Sylvie", "Lily of the West", "The Water is Wide", "Rake and a Ramblin' Boy", "A Quiet Girl", "Shady Grove", "Alberta", and "Empty Pocket Blues".

After Bonanza
After Bonanza, Roberts played summer stock theatre, regional theaters, and episodic TV, which gave him the opportunity to play a wide variety of roles. He toured with musicals such as The King and I, Kiss Me Kate, Camelot, and The Music Man, and dramas such as Tiny Alice. He played Jigger in an ABC television presentation of Carousel and was featured in a CBS Playhouse production, Dear Friends.

In 1967, Roberts starred in the lavish, but short-lived David Merrick production of Mata Hari, directed by Vincente Minnelli. The show had a much-publicized "chaotic" preview performance due to technical problems stemming from lack of rehearsal time at the National Theatre in Washington, DC, where the preview performance took place. "What was offered the people of Washington was a dress rehearsal. David Merrick spoke to the audience beforehand warning them of this." Problems were corrected by the official opening night, when the show received good reviews for Roberts, musical score and lyrics, stage design, and costumes, but poor reviews for its co-star and  other aspects of the production. The show, nevertheless, was thought to have the potential to continue to Broadway. "Mata Hari was a show with a great story, two fascinating characters, and some accessory mess that could have easily been tidied up by anyone but Vincente Minnelli." But Merrick, "instead of bringing someone to clean house closed the production down".

In 1972, Roberts returned to Broadway and toured with Ingrid Bergman in Captain Brassbound's Conversion, in which he played the title role. "Particularly helpful is Pernell Roberts in the acted-upon title role... This actor is a sturdy, not unamusing leading-man type and may his appearance as a Bergman costar be rewarded beyond Bonanza."

In 1973, Roberts was nominated for a Joseph Jefferson Award for his performance in Welcome Home at the Ivanhoe Theatre in Chicago.

The same year, Roberts starred as Rhett Butler opposite Lesley Ann Warren, in another major production, Gone with the Wind, at the Chandler Pavilion in Los Angeles, again receiving good personal reviews, amidst weak reviews for the rest of the show.

His additional stage credits after Bonanza include Two for the Seesaw, A Thousand Clowns, One Flew Over the Cuckoo's Nest, Any Wednesday, and  The Sound of Music (as Captain von Trapp).

He did The Night of the Iguana while still playing in Bonanza in 1963.

Roberts played Jim Conrad, the lead role, in the 1971 TV movie that served as a pilot for the series San Francisco International Airport, though the role was played by Lloyd Bridges in the actual episodes of the series. Roberts guest-starred in TV shows such as The Girl from U.N.C.L.E., The Virginian, The Big Valley, Lancer, Mission: Impossible (four episodes), Have Gun – Will Travel, Marcus Welby, M.D., The Wild Wild West, Ironside (two episodes), The Rockford Files, Gunsmoke, Mannix, Vega$, The Odd Couple, Hawaii Five-O, The Love Boat, Hotel, The Hardy Boys/Nancy Drew Mysteries, Nakia, Night Gallery, The Bold Ones, The Quest, Police Story, Most Wanted, Westside Medical, Man from Atlantis, Jigsaw John, Sixth Sense, Quincy, M.E.  The Feather and Father Gang, Hawkins, Men from Shiloh, Perry Mason, Wide World of Mystery, and The Six Million Dollar Man, and appeared in miniseries, including Captains and the Kings, Centennial, The Immigrants, and Around the World in 80 Days. He starred in two cult films, Four Rode Out (1971) and Kashmiri Run (1970), directed by veteran TV director John Peyser, and other feature films, including The Magic of Lassie (1978). He co-starred or was featured in several TV movies, including, The Adventures of Nick Carter, Dead Man on the Run, Assignment Viennas pilot Assignment: Munich, The Night Rider, The Silent Gun, The Lives of Jenny Dolan, The Deadly Tower, Hot Rod, Desperado, The Bravos, and High Noon, Part II: The Return of Will Kane.

In 1979, Roberts again achieved "superstar" status as the lead in Trapper John, M.D. (1979–1986), receiving an Emmy nomination in 1981; and playing the character twice as long as Wayne Rogers had (1972–1975) on CBSs M*A*S*H series. Roberts told TV Guide in 1979 that he chose to return to weekly television after watching his father age and realizing that it was a vulnerable time to be without financial security. "The show allowed Roberts to both use his dramatic range and address issues," wrote The Independent.Of the period between series, Roberts said he enjoyed moving around and playing different characters. During that time, he also toured university campuses conducting seminars on play production, acting, and poetry.

In 1980, Roberts reunited with his former Bonanza co-star Lorne Greene, for two episodes of Vega$.

In 1988, Roberts co-starred with Milla Jovovich in the TV movie The Night Train to Kathmandu.He guest-starred as Hezekiah Horn in the powerful Young Riders episode, "Requiem for a Hero", for which he won a Western Heritage Award in 1991.

In interviews, Roberts had described television as a "director's and film cutter's medium," but he himself was described as a "born television actor........low key."

In the 1980s and 1990s, playing off his Trapper John M.D. persona, Roberts acted as TV spokesman for Ecotrin, a brand of analgesic tablets. His roles since included Donor (1990) with Melissa Gilbert and Checkered Flag (1990). He appeared as captain of the CBS teams for Battle of the Network Stars 11 and 12.

He narrated documentaries, including the National Geographic episode, "Alaska, The Great Land" in 1965, "In the Realm of the Alligator" in 1986, the TV special Code One about the work of paramedics in 1989, and "The Mountain Men" episode of the History Channel, 1999.

From 1991 to 1993, in his last venture into series television, Roberts lent his distinctive voice to host and narrate the TV anthology series, FBI: The Untold Stories.  He made his last TV appearance in 1997 on an episode of Diagnosis: Murder, updating a Mannix character he had portrayed decades before.

In his later life, and after the death of all of his former Bonanza co-stars, Roberts "jokingly referred to himself as, 'Pernell, the last one, Roberts.'" He read Bonanza Gold Magazine, which was like looking at an old family album, he said, and watched reruns of Bonanza when he wanted to see old friends.

Personal life and death

Roberts married four times, first in 1951 to Vera Mowry — a professor of theatre history at Washington State University and subsequently Hunter College, as well as professor emerita of the PhD program in theatre at City University of New York — with whom he had his only child (Jonathan Christopher "Chris" Roberts). Roberts and his first wife later divorced. Chris Roberts attended Franconia College. He died in a motorcycle accident in 1989.

Roberts married Judith Anna LeBrecque on October 15, 1962; they divorced in 1971. He subsequently married Kara Knack in 1972, divorcing in 1996.

At the time of his death from pancreatic cancer on January 24, 2010, Roberts was married to Eleanor Criswell.

Selected filmography
FilmDesire Under the Elms (1958) - Peter CabotThe Sheepman (1958) - Chocktaw NealRide Lonesome (1959) - Sam BooneThe Errand Boy (1961) - Adam Cartwright - Cameo (uncredited)The Silent Gun (1969, TV Movie) - Sam BennerFour Rode Out (1970) - U.S. Marshal RossThe Kashmiri Run (1970) - Gregory NelsonThe Bravos (1972, TV Movie) - Jackson BuckleyAdventures of Nick Carter (1972 TV Movie) - Neal DuncanAssignment: Munich (1972, TV Movie) - C. C. BryanDead Man on the Run (1975, TV Movie) - Brock DillonThe Deadly Tower (1975, TV Movie) - Lieutenant LeeThe Lives of Jenny Dolan (1975, TV Movie) - Camera Shop ProprietorPaco (1976) - PompihoCharlie Cobb: Nice Night for a Hanging (1977 TV Movie) - Sheriff YatesThe Magic of Lassie (1978) - JamisonThe Immigrants (1978, TV Movie) - Anthony CassalaThe Night Rider (1979, TV Movie) - Alex SheridanHot Rod (1979, TV Movie) - Sheriff MarsdenHigh Noon, Part II: The Return of Will Kane (1980, TV Movie) - Marshal J. D. WardIncident at Crestridge (1981, TV Movie) - Mayor HillDesperado (1987, TV Movie) - Marshal DanceyThe Night Train to Kathmandu (1988, TV Movie) - Prof. Harry Hadley-SmithePerry Mason: The Case of the All-Star Assassin (1989, TV Movie) - Thatcher HortonDonor (1990, TV Movie) - Dr. MartingaleCheckered Flag (1990) - Andrew Valiant

Partial television creditsBonanza (1959–1965) - Adam CartwrightOne Step Beyond (1959) - Sgt. VaillGunsmoke (1967) - Stranger in Town (as hired killer, Dave Reeves)The Big Valley - 2 episodes, Cage of Eagles as Madigan and Run of the Cat as Ed TannerHawaii Five-O (1971) - The Grandstand Play - as Lon Phillips (pro baseball player)Cannon (1976) 5x18 The House Of Cards as Sid Cleary / Phil Denton Barnaby Jones (1977) - Testament of Power - as Daniel MatthewsMan from Atlantis (1977) - S1/E10 "Shoot-Out At Land's End" - as Clint HollisterVegas (1978–1980) - 3 episodesMannix (TV series) (1973) - “Little Lost Girl” as GeorgeHawkins (TV series) (1974) - “Candidate for Murder"Centennial (1978) - series 1, episodes 4, 5 - as Gen. AsherTrapper John, M.D. (1979–1986) - Trapper John McIntyreThe Love Boat (1980) - The Mallory QuestDiagnosis: Murder'' (1994–1997) - George Fallon / Dr. Elliott Valin (final appearance)

References
46. Demetria Fulton previewed Roberts in Barnaby Jones; episode titled, “Testament of Power”(01/20/1977).

External links

 
 
 

1928 births
2010 deaths
Male actors from Georgia (U.S. state)
American male television actors
American male stage actors
American male musical theatre actors
Deaths from cancer in California
Deaths from pancreatic cancer
People from Waycross, Georgia
Military personnel from Georgia (U.S. state)
United States Marines
Georgia Tech alumni
University System of Maryland alumni
Male Western (genre) film actors
20th-century American male actors
21st-century American male actors
Western (genre) television actors
Georgia (U.S. state) Democrats
California Democrats